Petr Eben International Organ Competition (or The Competition for Young Organists) is held in Opava in the Czech Republic since 1978. It is named in honour of the Czech organist and composer Petr Eben (19292007).

The competition consists of three rounds, held at the Petr Bezruč Library, the Church of the Holy Ghost and the Cathedral of the Assumption of Our Lady in Opava.

Jury 
 Roberto Antonello (Italy)
  (Germany)
  (Czech Republic)
  (France)
 Jon Laukvik (Germany)
 Petr Rajnoha (Czech Republic)
  (Germany)
  (Norway)
 Imrich Szabó (Slovakia)
 Jaroslav Tůma (Prague)
  (Czech Republic)

Laureates of Competition 
 Maria Mokhova (Russia)
 Arnfinn Tobiassen (Norway)
  (Hungary)
  (Czech Republic)
 Pavel Svoboda (Czech Republic)
  (Czech Republic)
 Kalnciema Liene Andreta (Latvia)
  (Czech Republic)
  (Czech Republic)

External links 
 Websites

Pipe organ
Music competitions in the Czech Republic